Anna Olsson (born 1 May 1976 as Anna Dahlberg in Kramfors, Ångermanland) is a Swedish cross-country skier who competed from 1996 to 2010. Competing in three Winter Olympics, she won a gold medal in the team sprint (with Lina Andersson) at Turin in 2006.

Olsson also won a silver medal in the team sprint event at the FIS Nordic World Ski Championships 2009 in Liberec. She also has twenty individual victories at all levels at various distances since 2000.

She married fellow skier Johan Olsson in 2008.

Cross-country skiing results
All results are sourced from the International Ski Federation (FIS).

Olympic Games
 1 medal – (1 gold)

World Championships
 1 medal – (1 silver)

a.  Cancelled due to extremely cold weather.

World Cup

Season standings

Individual podiums
 2 victories – (1 , 1 )
 14 podiums – (12 , 2 )

Team podiums

1 victory – (1 ) 
6 podiums – (3 , 3 )

References

External links

1976 births
Living people
People from Kramfors Municipality
Cross-country skiers from Västernorrland County
Cross-country skiers at the 2002 Winter Olympics
Cross-country skiers at the 2006 Winter Olympics
Cross-country skiers at the 2010 Winter Olympics
Olympic gold medalists for Sweden
Olympic cross-country skiers of Sweden
Swedish female cross-country skiers
Olympic medalists in cross-country skiing
FIS Nordic World Ski Championships medalists in cross-country skiing
Medalists at the 2006 Winter Olympics
Åsarna IK skiers
21st-century Swedish women